Table tennis at the 2015 African Games in Brazzaville was held between September 10 to 19, 2015.

Medal summary

Medals table

References

 
2015 African Games
African Games
2015